Live Nassau Coliseum '76 is a live album by David Bowie recorded on 23 March 1976 during Bowie's Isolar Tour in support of the album Station to Station. The recording was first released in September 2010, as part of special and deluxe editions of Station to Station.  The album was released separately on 10 February 2017.

Critical reception
Writer Nicholas Pegg described the album as "an excellent memento of one of Bowie’s greatest tours, with highlights including a majestic 'Word On A Wing', an  über-cool 'Waiting For The Man', and riotous, thrilling renditions of 'Stay' and 'The Jean Genie'" with "Bowie and his terrific 1976 band on blistering form."

Track listing
All tracks are written by David Bowie, except where noted.

Disc one
 "Station to Station" – 11:53
 "Suffragette City" – 3:31
 "Fame" (Bowie, Carlos Alomar, John Lennon) – 4:02
 "Word on a Wing" – 6:06
 "Stay" – 7:25
 "Waiting for the Man" (Lou Reed) – 6:20
 "Queen Bitch" – 3:12

Disc two
 "Life on Mars?" – 2:13
 "Five Years" – 5:03
 "Panic in Detroit"  – 6:03
 "Changes"  – 4:11
 "TVC 15" – 4:58
 "Diamond Dogs" – 6:38
 "Rebel Rebel" – 4:07
 "The Jean Genie" – 7:28

Personnel
 David Bowie – vocals
 Carlos Alomar – guitar
 Stacey Heydon – guitar
 George Murray – bass
 Tony Kaye – keyboards
 Dennis Davis – drums

Technical
 Dave Hewitt – recording engineer, 1976
 Harry Maslin – producer, mixing engineer
 Mixed at Sweetersongs East Studios, Santa Monica, California, USA in February 2009.
 Brian Gardner – mastering
 Andrew Kent – photography, 1976
 Scott Minshall – artwork

Chart performance

References

2017 live albums
David Bowie live albums
Live albums published posthumously
Parlophone live albums